Jozan may refer to:
 Jozan, iconic character in Dungeons & Dragons
 Jozan, Iran (disambiguation)
 Jozan rug, made in the surroundings of the village Jozan
 Jozani Chwaka Bay National Park, a national park of Tanzania located on the island of Zanzibar